Newcastle is the third-largest city in the province of KwaZulu-Natal, South Africa and is the province's industrial centre. The majority of its citizens reside in Newcastle East in the main townships of Madadeni and Osizweni, with the balance residing in Newcastle West (the two sides of Newcastle are separated by the N11 Road). Set at the foothills of the northern KwaZulu-Natal Drakensberg Mountains, Newcastle is located in the northwest corner of the province along the Ncandu River.

Newcastle is the seat of the local municipality, and the Amajuba District Municipality.

The N11 and R34 are the principal roads linking the city to the rest of South Africa.

History

Toponymy
Newcastle has changed names on numerous occasions during the country's historic rule. It was initially named Post Halt Number 2 on military maps during the 1840s, as postal coaches stopped here to obtain fresh horses on the journey between Durban (then Port Natal in Zuid-Afrikaansche Republiek) and Johannesburg. It was later known as the Waterfall River Township because of the Ncandu River. Newcastle was named after the British Colonial Secretary, the fifth Duke of Newcastle, a British aristocrat, and not the city in England as some believe. On 14 October 1899, during the Anglo-Boer War, Newcastle was invaded by Boer forces, and the entire district was incorporated into the Transvaal Republic. After seven months it was renamed Viljoensdorp, after the commander of the Johannesburg Commando, General Ben Viljoen. However, after relief of Ladysmith under the command of General Redver Buller, the British forces reclaimed the name Newcastle.

Establishment
Newcastle (then Post Halt Number 2) was strategically situated in 1854 by the Surveyor-General of the Natal Colony, Dr. P.C. Sutherland on the banks of the flooded Ncandu River. In 1864, Newcastle was founded on the site, becoming the fourth settlement to be established in Natal after Durban, Weenen and Pietermaritzburg.

War and British rule
In 1876, Fort Amiel was constructed to ward off the Zulus during the war, and in 1873 Newcastle became a separate electoral division. To commemorate Queen Victoria's Diamond Jubilee (60th anniversary), the construction of a sandstone town hall commenced in 1897, and was completed two years later. The town was used as a depot by the British during both the First and Second Boer War, and also functioned as a major transport junction and stopover for wagons and post chaises during the late 19th century.

British preparation work for the Pretoria Convention of 1881 was done at Newcastle.

The Industrial Era
In 1890, the first train arrived in Newcastle, and the town was declared a borough in 1891. The discovery of coal brought a new era of prosperity and several ambitious building projects were planned. In 1920, the Union Steel Corporation built the province's first steel plant, which later became the ISCOR South Works and subsequently decommissioned the plant after the ISCOR North Works was built, now called Arcelor Mittal Newcastle Works.

Newcastle today

Today, Newcastle is the main commercial and industrial centre in northern KwaZulu-Natal, and is the province's third-largest city. The municipality is making efforts for the city to become sustainable by 2030. Newcastle is the gateway to the Zulu Kingdom from the Free State and Mpumalanga.

Geography and climate

The city has a temperate climate and is classified under the country's 'Cold Interior'. Temperatures in Newcastle often drop below freezing during the winter months, with snowfall often experienced at least twice a decade. Newcastle's summer temperatures have exceeded 40 degrees Celsius in the recent past due to the 2015 El Niño weather phenomenon, with the region experiencing drought conditions after 28 years.

Demographics
Zulus form the largest single ethnic group. Due to its past, Newcastle has a large number of British, Afrikaner, and Indian people, with several places of worship and spiritual organizations based in the city's suburbs.

Since the mid-1980s, the city has seen an influx of Chinese citizens.The approximately 200 Chinese-owned businesses have contributed to Newcastle's textile and plastic manufacturing industries. The abolishing of Apartheid has seen the establishment of the Buddhist Light Association's Mediation Centre and Chinese School on Victoria Road. Since 1995 Indian-, Pakistan-, and African foreign nationals have also migrated to Newcastle.

Economy

Newcastle has the largest concentration of commerce and industry in northern KwaZulu-Natal. The city serves the surrounding towns of Utrecht, Vryheid, Dannhauser, Glencoe and Dundee, as well as the farmers, South Africa at large, and the export market with a range of  products and goods.

Industry
The city has four industrial areas, namely Riverside Industrial, Airport Industrial, Madadeni Industrial Estate, and Arcelor Mittal Newcastle Works. Newcastle's economy is dominated by heavy industry, clothing and textile, services, and engineering industries, as well as extensive local coal mining.

Arcelor Mittal steelworks, the Natal Portland Cement (NPC) slagment cement plant, the LANXESS Chrome Chemical Plant and the Karbochem synthetic rubber plant, which covers  manufacturing space dominate the Newcastle industrial area. Heavy engineering works firms such as DCD Venco and Boschpick Engineering supply ancillary services to the aforementioned large concerns and the rest of South Africa. 

Chinese and Taiwanese businesspeople established more than a hundred textile factories in the Riverside Industrial Estate and the Madadeni Industrial Estate.

In 2011 Independent Power South Africa (IPSA) converted the old Ngagane Power Station into the Newcastle Cogeneration Plant, an 18 MW gas fired powerstation that provides a dedicated power supply to the Karbochem chrome chemical plant which was completed during 2002.  

This joint venture project between Karbochem and German speciality chemical manufacturing giant LANXESS has made Newcastle the largest producer of chrome chemicals in Africa. The company announced an investment of €40 million in 2012 towards the construction of an innovative CO2 plant (Cansolv chemical process) at its site.

Arcelor Mittal Newcastle produces over 1.5 million tons of long steel products annually and in 2015 undertook a major reline on the N5 Blast Furnace valued at R1.8 billion.

In mid-2014, a portion of Airport Industrial was renamed the  Newcastle Chemical Park, and houses African Amines (Pty) Ltd, Karbochem (Pty) Ltd, KC Energy (Pty) Ltd, LANXESS (CISA) (Pty) Ltd, Newcastle Co-generation (IPSA), and South African Calcium Carbide (Pty) Ltd.

Other large operations include firms such as Formosa Plastics and Nova Clothing, both of which manufacture goods for the country's leading retailers, diamond-cutting works, various engineering concerns, and building industry-related services such as brick manufacturing, roofing systems, and steel reinforcement.

Retail

Newcastle has a very strong local trade scene, which is boosted by the surrounding towns of Utrecht, Vryheid, Dannhauser, Glencoe, Dundee, and Ladysmith.

Despite the development of decentralized shopping malls and centres around Newcastle, it's CBD still continues to trade strongly. The city has various major shopping facilities spread throughout, the most notable being the award-winning Newcastle Mall adjacent to the Blackrock Casino, Amajuba Mall, Newcastle Corner, Victorian Mall, Village Walk, Scott Street Mall, The Factory Plaza, Taxi City, Ithala Shopping Centre, Madadeni Crescent, Eyethu Junction Shopping Centre in Madadeni, and Theku Plaza in Osizweni.

Buildings and roads

Recent development in Newcastle include the new multi-storey Civic Centre, Victorian Mall expansion, the Meadowlands Estate in Madadeni, the Vulintaba Country Estate in the Drakensberg outside Newcastle, Newcastle Corner, and the Equarand mixed-use precinct.

Recent roadworks include the D96 rebuild, the Allen Street bridge and widening of Allen Street along Trim Park, the Link Road extension Phase 1, and the Albert Wessels Drive extension Phase 1. 

Proposed future projects include the Newcastle Technology Hub, expansion of the Newcastle Airport, and the re-alignment of the N11 bypass south of Newcastle by SANRAL.

Tallest structures

Industrial

Arcelor Mittal
Arcelor Mittal has a number of tall structures exceeding  in height. The most notable on Newcastle's skyline include:

Newcastle Co-generation Plant

Natal Portland Cement

Newcastle Chemical Park
This facility has several tall industrial structures and stacks above  in height.

Telecommunications

Buildings

Tourism

As Newcastle is on the alternate route to travellers from Gauteng to Durban, attempts have been made to capture potential tourist revenue by enticing travellers to visit the scenic and historic Battlefields Route where war once raged Battlefields Route Website. Apart from a few hotels, there are many guesthouses and bed & breakfasts providing luxurious accommodation. Historic places of interest in Newcastle on this route include:
Newcastle City Hall
The Carnegie Art Gallery
Haggards Hilldrop House
The Armoury
Newcastle Cemetery
Hindu Shiva Temple
Chief Albert Luthuli and the Blaauwbosch Methodist School and Church
King Dinuzulu & the Old Prison
Maharaj House
Fort Amiel Museum
O'Neills Cottage
Majuba Mountain

Transport

Road
Newcastle is well connected to Gauteng and the provinces coastal ports of Durban and Richards Bay on two main routes. The N11 is the principal road running through the city connecting it south to the N3 to Durban and north to the N4 to Gauteng, and through the provinces of Mpumalanga & Limpopo, and eventually to the border at Groblersbrug.

The R34 connects Newcastle to Gauteng via the N3 and the Free State to the west, and east to the port of Richards Bay via Vryheid and Empangeni.

Rail
Newcastle lies on the main passenger and goods railway line between Johannesburg and Durban. The city has a large rail siding and cargo facility.

Airport
Chartered flights provide daily service, and a full service with one of the country's airlines is in planning.

Taxis and buses
Minibus taxis are the most affordable and quickest form of transport for the majority of the population for those residing in Newcastle East. These are owned by taxi associations, and in the recent years inter-operator violence has flared up from time to time, especially as turf wars over lucrative taxi routes resulting in the deaths of many taxi operators.

Apart from the thousands of taxis that traverse the city streets daily, Transnat Coach Lines and Stabus (subsidiaries of Tans Africa Holdings (Pty) Ltd are the largest bus operators in Newcastle.

Society and culture

Galleries

 The Carnegie Art Gallery represents South African artists as well as local artists; this historic building falls within the city's civic precinct.

Museums, monuments and memorials
 Fort Amiel Museum, a typical Victorian frontier fort, is a National Heritage Site.

Music
Newcastle is home to the Northern KwaZulu-Natal Youth Choir – a provincial choir of international repute.

The annual Vodacom Winter Festival aka 'Newcastle Show' provides a platform for South African bands and singers, and attracts visitors from the entire region. Notable performers who performed for the event include Matthew Mole, Cassper Nyovest, Majozi, Snotkop, and Jo Black.

Places of worship
Newcastle has all of the major religious organizations represented; churches, temples, and mosques can be found throughout the city. Landmarks include the NG Kerk on York Street, and the Hindu Shiva Temple on Kirkland Street. The Darul Uloom on St Thomas Street, an institute of higher Islamic studies, is a landmark in Newcastle's diverse community with a modern mosque on the premises.

Sport
Newcastle remains a venue for major sports competitions and conferences because of the facilities the city has to offer. A variety of rugby, cricket, soccer, squash, tennis, swimming, and other sport facilities has contributed to its ability to host both national and international events.

Stadia
Newcastle has numerous multi-purpose stadia around the city, which are mostly used to host local sport competitions, school sports and inter-school sports; these accommodate soccer, cricket, rugby, squash, tennis, and volleyball. The most notable stadia are the Newcastle Swimming Pool, Arbor Park Grounds, Paradise A & B, and the Madadeni Sports Stadium.

Swimming
Newcastle has five public swimming pools; the Olympic-sized Newcastle swimming pool in Sunnyridge (previously the Ferrum swimming pool) recently hosted the All-Africa Development Gala.

Sports complex
Located in Arbor Park, this modern complex has indoor and outdoor facilities, with a bowling green.

Wrestling
Newcastle Wrestling Academy is one of the top wrestling clubs in KwaZulu-Natal.

Fishing
Newcastle is home to the Challengers Angling Club and an annual angling competition is held to assist local charities.

Rugby
The local rugby club is the Newcastle Highlanders Rugby.

Soccer
Newcastle is home to Stella Football Club and has produced players to represent the province and country.

Cricket
Newcastle has a local cricket league, and matches are hosted at various stadiums around the city.

Golf
Newcastle has three golf courses: one 18 hole golf course, Newcastle Golf Club, and two 9 hole golf courses, Kilbarchan Golf Club and Vulintaba Country Estate.

Horse riding
Newcastle has a horse riding club and training course.

Parks and recreation

Ntshingwayo Dam
Established in 1975, Ntshingwayo Dam (previously Chelmsford Dam) is the third-largest in the province. Located approximately  South West of Newcastle on the Ngagane River, Ntshingwayo Dam is Newcastle's main source of water supply. The surrounding reserve covers an area of 6,500 ha. and is managed by Ezemvelo KZN Wildlife.

The 1,500 ha Game Park has a range of highveld game and bird viewing is common. The park also features the largest population of the rare oribi in South Africa. 

Sailing, powerboating, water-skiing and swimming are popular activities on the 3,400 ha. dam and is known as a fishing destination for both hobby and competition anglers, with carp, barbel, and scaly the most commonly caught.

Amcor Dam
This small dam lies on the Ncandu River in the suburb of Ncandu Park. Amcor dam has various recreation facilities, including playgrounds, swimming pools, and braai (barbeque) areas, and is popular on public holidays and weekends. It is also home to the Newcastle Caravan Park.

Newcastle Golf Course
The Newcastle Golf Course is located in the suburb of Barry Hertzog Park and offers a mashie course, a driving range, an 18 hole course, a clubhouse, and a restaurant.

Ncandu State Forest
The reserve offers various trails to view sandstone cliffs, waterfalls, and various bird species. Access to the viewpoints is either by boat or boardwalks.

Parks
The city has many public parks within its suburbs; such as the Trim Park and The Gardens on Hospital Street. Trim Park is located north of the CBD along the Ncandu River. It is often frequented on weekends and holidays, and is used for hosting picnics and barbecues.

The Gardens on Hospital Street offers an expansive grassy garden with large shady trees, and is located in the suburb of Newcastle Central. The park is used by Newcastillians to walk their pets and play in a free environment. The Gardens are popular on wedding occasions as they offer backdrops for photographs to be taken.

Urban play parks
This type of park was created to provide playing facilities for the youth in a secure, green play zone. Kids may play unsupervised by parents, as they are under the watchful eye of park security.

Education

Primary and secondary education
The city is home to numerous major primary and high schools, both government and private. With private schooling on the increase in South Africa, there has been a recent influx of private schools varying in size.

Newcastle High School and St. Dominic's Academy Newcastle are considered two of the city's most prestigious schools.

Meridian Newcastle, a leading independent school (part of Curro Schools) was established in Madadeni, a township of Newcastle, to cater for the increased need of education in the east of the city. 

Newcastle schools are home to several buildings that have been declared National Monuments, the most famous being The Pavilion at St. Dominic's Academy which was designed by Brother Nivard Streicher and built in 1912.
It was declared a monument in 1977 by Dr. Piet Koornhof.

Established in 1882, Newcastle High School is the oldest school in the area. The original school buildings are still in use today as the school's administration block.

Both the Newcastle Brass Band and the Northern KwaZulu-Natal Youth Choir are based in Ferrum High School.

Newcastle's main townships of Madadeni and Osizweni are home to schools such as Osizweni High School, Indonsa Technical High School, St. Lewis Bertrand’s High School, Bethamoya High School, Phendukani High School, Siyamukela High School, Thubelihle High School, Sesiyabonga High School and Ikhwezi High School. Sabela Senior Secondary School is the only high school situated in Madadeni Section 5 and is best known for its athletics.

Other schools in Newcastle include Newcastle Islamic Collage, Amajuba High School, Tugela High School, St Oswald's Secondary (the oldest school of Indian origin), and Lincoln Heights Secondary School. Some junior schools include Hutten Park Primary, Drakensberg Primary, Newcastle Senior Primary, Busy-Bee and Arbor Park Primary, Lennoxton Primary, S.E. Vawda Primary, Suryaville Primary and Chelmsford Primary.

Tertiary education
Majuba FET College has five separate campuses around Newcastle, as well as a campus in the surrounding town of Dundee.

Qualitas Career Academy, a national private college has a campus in the CBD. It caters for full-time and part-time studies for students, as well as corporate training and consulting services for businesses and government departments.

UNISA, Damelin, and Boston City Campus & Business College have satellite campuses in Newcastle.

Medical

Newcastle has three hospitals, two government owned and one privately owned: Newcastle Provincial Hospital (186 beds), Madadeni Hospital (1620 authorized beds, 1154 usable beds) and Mediclinic Newcastle (254 authorized beds, 186 operational beds). There are also several clinics and various specialist physicians.

In addition, the La Gratitude Home for the Aged provides retirement and care facilities for the elderly.

There are also 16 government clinics in Osizweni and Madadeni, caring for the health of the broader community.

Media

Print
Caxton Community Newspapers is a major printer and publisher of newsprint materials in the region. Major newspapers include the Newcastle Advertiser, Newcastle Sun, Amajuba Eyethu, Agrieco, and the Northern Natal Get It Magazine. Other local publications include Tabloid Media's Newcastle Express.

Online media
Pixelfish Marketing Solutions (Pty) Ltd owns and produces the Newcastillian - Online News, an independent news product. The digital news medium services the Newcastle, Northern KwaZulu-Natal, and KwaZulu-Natal communities.

Broadcasting
Newcastle Community Radio is an independent local radio station broadcasting to Newcastle from their studio in Madadeni on 103.7fm Newcastle Community Radio Website.

Radio 034 is an online radio station located in Newcastle.

Lit Radio ZA is an online radio based in Madadeni Section 2, targeting local youth and other issues that affect the community.

Suburbs

Mixed-race residential
Amajuba Park
Amiel Park
Arbor Park
Aviary Hill
Barry Hertzog Park
Hutten Heights
Ingagane
Ncandu Park
Newcastle Central
Pioneer Park
Schuinshoogte
Signal Hill
Sunnyridge

Former 'Indian' residential
Fernwood
Ghandi Park
Lennoxton
Paradise
Richview
Sunset View
Suryaville

Former 'Coloured' residential
Fairleigh
Lenville

Townships
Blaauwbosch
Cavan
Claremont
Dicks Halt
Eastbourne
Fulathela
Inverness
Jakkalspan
Kwamathukuza
Lekkerwater
Leslie
Madadeni - Sections A to P
Mndozo
Osizweni - Sections A to F
Emaskral

Mixed-use areas
Equarand
Newcastle CBD
Vlam
Vulintaba

Industrial zones
Airport Industrial
Arcelor Mittal North Works
Madadeni Industrial Estate
Riverside Industrial

International relations
Newcastle has been internationally connected since the Industrial Era, and is today home to many international industries, the most well-known  being steel giant Arcelor Mittal, chrome chemical companies Bayer & Lanxess, synthetic rubber manufacturer Karbochem, and heavy engineering firm DCD Venco.

Furthermore, since the late 1980s Newcastle has built a strong relationship with mainland China and also Taiwan, following the influx of Chinese nationals in the mid-1980s. To date, China has invested in approximately 100 factories in Newcastle, employing thousands of workers.

Twin towns / sister cities
Newcastle is part of a global community of Newcastles Newcastles of the World Website, being the third-largest Newcastle in the world by population. Newcastle was part of the 1998 summit of worldwide cities named "New Castle" with:

Newcastle is twinned with:

 Nanchang, China (since 2010)

References

External links

 Newcastle Community Website
 Newcastle Municipality Website
 Amajuba District Municipality Website
 KZN Tourism Website

Populated places in the Newcastle Local Municipality
Populated places established in 1864
Mining communities in South Africa